Richard McArthur (born 1943) is a Republican member of the Nevada Assembly. First elected in 2008, he was defeated in his 2012 primary bid for the Nevada Senate, but he regained his Assembly seat in 2016. McArthur represents the 4th district, which covers parts of the northwestern Las Vegas Valley.

Biography
McArthur was born in Lake Forest, Illinois, in 1943, growing up in Fair Oaks, California. He received his Bachelor of Arts in economics from the University of California, Davis, and served in the Vietnam War as a United States Air Force captain from 1966 until 1972. McArthur worked as a Federal Bureau of Investigation special agent, and now is retired.

McArthur was first elected in 2008, defeating Craig Ballew and two other candidates. Deciding to run for the state Senate rather than reelection to the Assembly in 2012, he faced fellow Assemblyman Scott Hammond in the Republican primary. Hammond, who was seen as more moderate than McArthur, won the primary by nearly 14 points and went on to win the general election.

McArthur sought reelection to his old seat in 2016; it had been vacated by Michele Fiore, who unsuccessfully ran for the United States House of Representatives. He won a three-way Republican primary and narrowly won the general election.

Personal life
McArthur and his wife, Trish, have 2 children: Kimberly and Michele, and five grandchildren.

Political positions
McArthur supports the right to keep and bear arms. He advocates for deportation of illegal immigrants residing in the state of Nevada.

McArthur opposes legalization of recreational marijuana, expressing his opposition to Nevada Question 2 (2016), which legalized recreational marijuana in the state. He was rated the most conservative member of the Assembly by the American Conservative Union in 2011.

Electoral history

References

External links
 
 Campaign website
 Legislative website

1943 births
Living people
Federal Bureau of Investigation agents
Republican Party members of the Nevada Assembly
People from Fair Oaks, California
People from Lake Forest, Illinois
Politicians from Las Vegas
University of California, Davis alumni
21st-century American politicians